Hortus botanicus is a Latin term for botanical garden. It may refer to: 

Hortus Botanicus Leiden
Hortus Botanicus Amsterdam
Hortus Botanicus Vrije Universiteit Amsterdam